Kamala Nagar may refer to:

 Kamala Nagar, Bangalore
Kamala Nagar, Hyderabad